Against the Grain is a 1981 Australian film directed by Tim Burns.

The film had censorship issues.

References

External links
 Against the Grain at Australian Screen Online
 Against the Grain at Oz Movies

Australian crime drama films
1980s English-language films
1981 films
1981 drama films
1980s Australian films